St Christopher's School is a British private school located in Isa Town, Bahrain (senior campus) and Sar, Bahrain (infant and junior campuses), offering British curriculum education. It offers primary to secondary education ranging from reception to Sixth form. Students sit GCSE and A-level examinations.

In 2006, the Guardian newspaper listed St. Christopher's amongst the top eight best international schools offering a British curriculum around the world.

In December 2013, Queen Elizabeth II awarded the school's long term principal, Ed Goodwin, with an OBE for his contribution to British education in the Middle East.

In September 2021, Spear's Wealth Management Survey ranked St. Christopher's amongst the top 100 private schools in the world.

School principals

Notable alumni

Yara Salman

See also

 List of schools in Bahrain

References

External links
St Christopher's School website

International schools in Bahrain
British international schools in Asia
Schools in Bahrain
Isa Town